Follett is a town in Lipscomb County, Texas, United States, which was established in 1917 by Santa Fe railroad official Thomas C. Spearman as a townsite on the North Texas and Santa Fe Railway. It was named for Horace Follett, a locating engineer for the line.  The population was 459 at the 2010 census.

Geography

Follett is located at  (36.432150, –100.141073).

Climate

According to the Köppen Climate Classification system, Follett has a semi-arid climate, abbreviated "BSk" on climate maps.

Demographics

As of the census of 2000, there were 412 people, 174 households, and 112 families residing in the town. The population density was 425.1 people per square mile (164.0/km). There were 242 housing units at an average density of 249.7/sq mi (96.3/km). The racial makeup of the town was 91.75% White, 1.46% Native American, 6.07% from other races, and 0.73% from two or more races. Hispanic or Latino of any race were 7.28% of the population.

There were 174 households, out of which 28.2% had children under the age of 18 living with them, 56.9% were married couples living together, 6.9% had a female householder with no husband present, and 35.1% were non-families. 33.3% of all households were made up of individuals, and 21.8% had someone living alone who was 65 years of age or older. The average household size was 2.37 and the average family size was 3.04.

In the town the population was spread out, with 26.5% under the age of 18, 5.6% from 18 to 24, 21.8% from 25 to 44, 26.5% from 45 to 64, and 19.7% who were 65 years of age or older. The median age was 42 years. For every 100 females, there were 89.9 males. For every 100 females age 18 and over, there were 83.6 males.

The median income for a household in the town was $29,583, and the median income for a family was $36,000. Males had a median income of $33,750 versus $15,781 for females. The per capita income for the town was $16,315. About 12.3% of families and 17.3% of the population were below the poverty line, including 21.0% of those under age 18 and 24.4% of those age 65 or over.

Education
The Town of Follett is served by the Follett Independent School District.

References

Cities in Texas
Cities in Lipscomb County, Texas